The pound was the currency of several British Caribbean territories until 1949 when it was generally replaced by the West Indian dollar. It was equivalent to sterling and was divided into 20 shillings, each of 12 pence.

See also

Sterling Area

References
Early history of money in the British West Indies, Central Bank of Barbados

Modern obsolete currencies
1949 disestablishments
Currencies of Trinidad and Tobago
Currencies of the Caribbean